Herbert Eastwick Compton (16 November 1853 – 1906) was an English novelist, biographer, world traveller, and writer on miscellaneous topics, including the Georgian era and other historical subjects, India, economics and fiscal matters, and dogs.

Biography
His parents were Colonel D'Oyly Compton of the Honourable East India Company Service and Louise Eastwick. Herbert E. Compton was educated at Malvern College and spent twenty-two years in India. Herbert E. Compton was a leader writer for the Tariff Reform League in 1904, was appointed Organising Secretary of the Anti-Tea-Duty League in 1905, and organised the agitation against what the Anti-Tea-Duty League regarded as the British Empire's excessive duty on tea.

H. E. Compton married Lucy Ellinor Faddy (1861–1908). He was the father of Ellice Dorothy Amy Compton (1881–1950), who married Philip Egerton Tickle in 1907, and Florence D'Oyly Compton (1888–1918), who became a British Army nurse in WWI and drowned in a launch accident near Basra, Iraq. H. E. Compton had two famous maternal uncles: Professor Edward Backhouse Eastwick (1814–1883) and Captain William Joseph Eastwick (1808–1889).

He committed suicide at sea in July or August 1906 en route to Madeira.

Selected publications

As co-author
 with Erskine Reid:

As editor
 (Robert William Eastwick was H. E. Compton's maternal grandfather.)

References

1853 births
1906 deaths
19th-century English writers
20th-century English writers
20th-century English male writers
English biographers
19th-century British male writers
19th-century British writers
20th-century male writers
People educated at Malvern College